Events in the year 2011 in Bulgaria.

Incumbents 

 President: Georgi Parvanov
 Prime Minister: Boyko Borisov

Events 
September 26: Two people have been killed and six others injured in ethnic clashes in the Bulgarian city of Plovdiv.
2011 Bulgaria antiziganist protests The reason for the unrest was the murder of a local youth, who was run over by a car by the close associate of local Roma boss Kiril Rashkov.

References 

2011 in Bulgaria
2010s in Bulgaria
Years of the 21st century in Bulgaria
Bulgaria
Bulgaria